Ann Cotten (born 1982 in Ames, Iowa) is an American-born Austrian writer.

Life and work
At the age of five, Cotten moved to Vienna with her parents, who are both biochemists who worked in Vienna.
She finished university there in 2006 with a work about concrete poetry. At the same time she first emerged as a poet at poetry slams. 
In 2007 Cotten, whose work has been published in anthologies and poetry journals, found considerable success as a writer with her first book, Fremdwörterbuchsonnette, which was published at Suhrkamp. Other books with Suhrkamp are Florida-Räume in 2001, Der schaudernde Fächer in 2013, Verbannt! Versepos in 2016.

Some of Cotten's poems have been translated into English and published in journals like burning deck (USA). In 2010 she collaborated with visual artist Kerstin Cmelka in a book called I, Coleoptile containing original English poetry and film stills, published by Broken Dimanche Press. The book Lather in Heaven, published by the same editor in 2016, assembles her work in English up to date, as well as some selected translations from the German.

In 2016, Jikiketsugaki. Tsurezuregusa, was published by the Peter Engstler Verlag. It contains a selection of Cotten's poems and prose, inspired by Japan, Japanese literature, and the semiotics of the Japanese language. Fast Dumm, Essays von on the road is a reflecting book about visiting the United States, including poems, essays, photographies and her own translations of poems of other poets, like Sergei Yesenin, Vladimir Mayakovsky, W.H. Auden, Langston Hughes, Katia Sophia Ditzler. The book was published by Starfruit Publications in 2017.

Cotten lives in Vienna and in Berlin. She relinquished US citizenship in 2005.

Publications 
 Fremdwörterbuchsonette, poetry, Suhrkamp, Frankfurt/Main 2007, .
 Nach der Welt. Die Listen der konkreten Poesie und ihre Folgen., essay, Klever, Vienna 2008, .
 Glossarattrappen, prose, AusnahmeVerlag, Hamburg 2008, .
 Das Pferd. SuKuLTuR, Berlin 2009 (Schöner Lesen Nr. 84), .
 Florida-Räume, poetry, Suhrkamp, Frankfurt/Main 2010, .
 Helm aus Phlox. Zur Theorie des schlechtesten Werkzeugs. Merve Verlag, Berlin 2011, .
 Pflock in der Landschaft, Schock Edition (1), EdK/Distillery, Berlin 2011, .
 I, Coleoptile, poetry (English), Broken Dimanche Press, Berlin-Oslo-Dublin 2010, .
 Jikiketsugaki. Tsurezuregusa. Verlag Peter Engstler, Ostheim/Rhön 2016, .
 Lather in Heaven! (English), Broken Dimanche Press, Berlin-Oslo-Dublin 2016, .
 Fast Dumm, Essays von on the road, Starfruit Publications, Fürth 2017, .
 Lyophilia, Erzählungen, Suhrkamp Verlag, Berlin 2019, .

Honors 
 2007: Reinhard-Priessnitz-Preis
 2008: George-Saiko-Reisestipendium
 2008: Clemens-Brentano-Preis
 2012: Newcomer award of the Hermann-Hesse-Preis
 2014: Adelbert-von-Chamisso-Preis
 2014: Wilhelm-Lehmann-Preis
 2015: Newcomer award of the Ernst-Bloch-Preis
 2015: Klopstock-Preis
 2017: Hugo-Ball-Preis
 2017: Elected into the Berlin Academy Arts
 2018: Stipend for the Villa Aurora

References

External links 

 Ann Cotten on the website of Suhrkamp-publishing (german)
 Website for "Lather in Heaven"
 Review of I,Coleoptile in English from De Reactor
 Ann Cotten on the website of Peter Engstler Verlag (german)
 Ann Cotten on the website of starfruit publications (german)
 Click: A Conversation with Ann Cotten (Interview in English and German), Cordite Poetry Review
 Article on the book Florida-Räume in the German weekly news magazine Die Zeit
 Interview in English with Ann Cotten at 3AM Magazine
 review of the English translation
 Entry at Poetry International Web

American poets in German
American women poets
American writers in German
German poets
American emigrants to Germany
People from Ames, Iowa
Living people
1982 births
German women poets
Austrian women poets
21st-century American poets
21st-century American women writers